Akila Lakshan (born 19 November 1995) is a Sri Lankan cricketer. He made his List A debut for Vauniya District in the 2016–17 Districts One Day Tournament on 18 March 2017.

References

External links
 

1995 births
Living people
Sri Lankan cricketers
Sri Lanka Police Sports Club cricketers
Vauniya District cricketers
Place of birth missing (living people)